Tosena depicta is a cicada species from Southeast Asia

References

External links
Song of Tosena depicta

Hemiptera of Asia
Taxa named by William Lucas Distant
Insects described in 1888
Tosenini